Muzolimine is a High-ceiling loop diuretic. It is a pyrazole diuretic which was used for treatment of hypertension but was withdrawn worldwide because of severe neurological side effects.

Synthesis

Rxn of (1-(3,4-dichlorophenyl)ethyl)hydrazine (1) with ethyl 3-amino-3-ethoxyacrylate (2) leads to a ring-forming two-site reaction and formation of the pyrazoline diuretic agent, muzolimine (3).

References 

Diuretics
Chloroarenes
Pyrazolones